Josh is a masculine given name, frequently a diminutive (hypocorism) of the given names Joshua or Joseph, though since the 1970s, it has increasingly become a full name on its own. It may refer to:

People

A–J
Josh A. Moore (born 1980), American former basketball player
Josh Adams (American football) (born 1996), American football player
Josh Allen (disambiguation), multiple people
Josh Appelt (born 1983), American mixed martial artist
Josh Ball (born 1998), American football player
Josh Barnett (born 1977), American mixed martial artist and professional wrestler
Josh Beckett (born 1980), American former Major League Baseball pitcher
Josh Bell (disambiguation), multiple people
Josh Berry (born 1990), American racing driver
Josh Bilicki (born 1995), American racing driver
Josh Binstock (born 1981), Canadian Olympic volleyball player
Josh Blackwell (born 1999), American football player
Josh Boyer (born 1977), American football coach
Josh Brolin (born 1968), American actor
Josh Brown (disambiguation), multiple people
Josh Bynes (born 1989), American football player
Josh Carraway (born 1994), American football player
Josh Charles (born 1971), American actor
Josh Childress (born 1983), American basketball player
Josh Cooper (cryptographer) (1901–1981), British cryptographer
Josh Cooper (defensive end) (born 1980), American football player, formerly in the NFL
Josh Cooper (wide receiver) (born 1989), American former NFL player
Josh Culbreath (1932–2021), American hurdler
Josh Donaldson (born 1985), American baseball player
Josh Duggar (born 1988), American reality TV participant and political activist
Josh Duhamel (born 1972), American actor and former model
Josh Dun (born 1988), American drummer and trumpeter, currently in the band Twenty One Pilots
Josh Freeman (born 1988), American football player
Josh Gad (born 1981), American actor
Josh Gibson (1911–1947), American Negro league baseball catcher
Josh Gordon (disambiguation), multiple people
Josh Groban (born 1981), American singer, songwriter, actor and record producer
Josh Guyer (born 1994), Australian professional baseball player
Josh Hader (born 1994), American baseball player
Josh Hall (disambiguation), multiple people
Josh Hamilton (actor) (born 1969), American actor  
Josh Hamilton (born 1981), American Major League Baseball player
Josh Hammond (born 1998), American football player
Josh Harris (disambiguation), multiple people
Josh Harrison (born 1987), American baseball player
Josh Hartnett (born 1978), American actor and movie producer
Josh Harvey-Clemons (born 1994), American football player
Josh Hawley (born 1979), American politician and current U.S. senator from Missouri
Josh Henderson (born 1981), American actor, model and singer
Josh Hoffman (born 1988), Australian rugby league player
Josh Holloway (born 1969), American actor
Josh Homme (born 1973), American singer, songwriter, musician, record producer and actor
Josh Hope (born 1998), Australian association football player
Josh Howard (born 1980), American basketball player, formerly in the National Basketball Association (NBA)
Josh Huff (born 1991), American football player
Josh Hutcherson (born 1992), American actor
Josh Imatorbhebhe (born 1998), American football player
Josh Jackson (basketball) (born 1997), American basketball player
Josh Jackson (cornerback) (born 1996), American football player
Josh Jackson (rugby league) (born 1991), Australian rugby league player
Josh Jacobs (born 1998), American football player
Josh Jasper (born 1987), All-American college football placekicker
Josh Jobe (born 1998), American football player
Josh Johnson (disambiguation), multiple people

K–Z
Josh Kennet (born 1987), English-Israeli footballer
Josh Kline (born 1989), American football player
Josh Kline (artist) (born 1979), American artist
Josh Klinghoffer (born 1979), American guitarist with the rock band Red Hot Chili Peppers
Josh Kronfeld (born 1971), New Zealand former rugby union flanker
Josh Lafazan (born 1994), American politician
Josh Law (born 1989), English footballer
Josh Lindblom (born 1987), American professional baseball player
Josh Love (born 1996), American football player
Josh Mahoney (born 1977), former Australian rules footballer
Josh Malihabadi (1894–1982), Pakistani poet
Josh Malone (born 1996), American football player
Josh Malsiyani (1883–1976), Indian poet
Josh Mansour (born 1990), Australian rugby league player
Josh Mayo (born 1987), American basketball player
Josh McCown (born 1979), American football player
Josh McDaniels (born 1976), American football coach
Josh McEachran (born 1993), English footballer
Josh McGuire (born 1990), Australian rugby league player
Josh McRoberts (born 1987), American basketball player
Josh Metellus (born 1998), American football player
Josh Meyers (disambiguation), multiple people
Josh Miller (American football) (born 1970), American football player
Josh Morris (disambiguation), multiple people
Josh Mostel (born 1946), American actor
Josh Nebo (born 1997), American basketball player in the Israeli Basketball Premier League
Josh Norman (born 1987), American football player
Josh Nurse (born 1996), American football player
Josh Oliver (born 1997), American football player
Josh Pais (born 1958), American actor and acting coach
Josh Palmer (born 1999), Canadian-American football player
Josh Pastner (born 1977), American college basketball coach
Josh Pearson (born 1997), American football player
Josh Peck (born 1986), American actor
Josh Pederson (born 1997), American football player
Josh Perkins (born 1995), basketball player in the Israeli Basketball Premier League
Josh Radnor (born 1974), American actor, director, producer and screenwriter
Josh Ravin (born 1988), American professional baseball player
Josh Reddick (born 1987), American baseball player
Josh Reynolds (American football) (born 1995), American football player
Josh Reynolds (born 1989), Australian rugby league player
Josh Rosen (born 1997), American football quarterback for UCLA Bruins football
Josh Ross (disambiguation), multiple people
Josh Samuels (born 1991), American water polo player 
Josh Satin (born 1984), American former Major League Baseball player
Josh Server (born 1979), American actor and comedian
Josh Shipp (basketball) (born 1986), American basketball player
Josh Sills (born 1998), American football player
Josh Sitton (born 1986), American football player
Josh Smith (disambiguation), multiple people
Josh Starling (born 1990), Australian rugby league player
Josh Sweat (born 1997), American football player
Josh Taves (born 1972), American former NFL player
Josh Thomas (disambiguation), multiple people
Josh Thompson (disambiguation), multiple people
Josh Tols (born 1989), Australian professional baseball player
Josh Tomlin (born 1984), American baseball player
Josh Tordjman (born 1985), Canadian hockey goaltender
Josh Uche (born 1998), American football player
Josh Wagenaar (born 1985), Canadian former footballer
Josh Walker (American football) (born 1991), American NFL player
Josh Walker (Australian footballer) (born 1992), Australian rules footballer
Josh Walker (footballer, born 1989), English footballer
Josh Watson (American football) (born 1996), American football player
Josh West (born 1977), British-American Olympic rower and Earth Sciences professor
Josh Weston, an actor from the United states
Josh Whitesell (born 1982), American former Major League Baseball and Nippon Professional Baseball player
Josh Whyle (born 1999), American football player
Josh Widdicombe (born 1983), English stand-up comedian and presenter
Josh Wilcox (born 1974), American former NFL player
Josh Williams (disambiguation), multiple people
Josh Willingham (born 1979), American baseball player
Josh Wilson (disambiguation), multiple people
Josh Woodrum (born 1992), American football player
Josh Woods (American football) (born 1996), American football player
Josh Zeid (born 1987), American former professional baseball pitcher, formerly in Major League Baseball

Fictional characters
Josh Bauer (24), a minor character in season 6 of the American television series 24
Josh Chan, in the American television series Crazy Ex-Girlfriend
Josh Lyman, in the American television series The West Wing
Josh (Arrowverse), in the American television series The Flash
 Josh, in the American television series Younger
 Josh Baskin, the protagonist of the film Big
 Josh Nichols, in the American television series Drake & Josh
 Joshua "Josh" Washington, one of eight protagonists from the survival horror game Until Dawn

See also
Jawsh 685, New Zealand music producer
Josh fight, a tongue-in-cheek 2021 event that took place in Lincoln, Nebraska

English masculine given names
Masculine given names
Hypocorisms